Francesco della Rovere di Savona (1505–1545) was a Roman Catholic prelate who served as Archbishop of Benevento (1530–1545),
Bishop of Volterra (1514–1530),
Bishop of Vicenza (1509–1514),
Bishop of Camerino (1508–1509), 
and Bishop of Mileto (1505–1508).

Biography
In 1505, Francesco della Rovere was appointed during the papacy of Pope Julius II as Bishop of Mileto.
On 23 Feb 1508, he was appointed during the papacy of Pope Julius II as Bishop of Camerino.
In Jul 1509, he was appointed during the papacy of Pope Julius II as Bishop of Vicenza.
On 12 Jun 1514, he was appointed during the papacy of Pope Leo X as Bishop of Volterra.
On 12 Jan 1530, he was appointed during the papacy of Pope Clement VII as Archbishop of Benevento.
He served as Archbishop of Benevento until his resignation on 2 Apr 1544. 
He died in 1545.

References

External links and additional sources
 (for Chronology of Bishops) 
 (for Chronology of Bishops) 
 (for Chronology of Bishops) 
 (for Chronology of Bishops) 
 (for Chronology of Bishops) 
 (for Chronology of Bishops) 
 (for Chronology of Bishops)

Della Rovere family
Bishops appointed by Pope Julius II
Bishops appointed by Pope Leo X
Bishops appointed by Pope Clement VII
1505 births
1545 deaths
16th-century Italian Roman Catholic bishops